Bulgari is a surname. Notable people with the surname include:

Beatrice Bulgari, Italian costume designer
Gianni Bulgari (born 1935), Italian jewelry designer and businessman
Giorgio Bulgari (1890–1966), Italian businessman
Nicola Bulgari (born 1941), Italian businessman
Paolo Bulgari (born 1937), Italian businessman

See also
Voulgaris, the equivalent surname in Greek
Bulgari (disambiguation)